RTS Info refers to the news platforms (radio, TV and on-line) of the Radio Télévision Suisse (French-language branch of the Swiss Broadcasting Corporation and is also the name of its virtual television channel launched on 26 December 2006.

It broadcasts 24 hours a day using an Internet stream, and many times (especially in the night and the early morning) simulcasts on RTS 2. Contents of the channel are given by RTS redaction and SwissTXT.

Logos and identities

Programmes
 Videos of the beak down news
 Rediffusion of the RTS news bulletin of 12.45 PM, 6.55 PM and 7.30 PM
 Swiss weather forecast 
 Press review of Swiss French journals
 Textual news bulletin

Notes and references

External links
 Official website

Television stations in Switzerland
French-language television in Switzerland
Television channels and stations established in 2006